SM Supermalls, also simply known as SM is a chain of shopping malls owned by Philippines-based SM Prime. It has 82 shopping malls in the Philippines as of November 2022 and has seven malls in China.

History

SM Supermalls was pioneered by Henry Sy, a Chinese Filipino businessman whose roots traces back to Fujian. Sy opened his first shoe store in Quiapo in 1948 and later the first store under the Shoemart (SM) name in 1958 along Carriedo. In 1972, Shoemart turned into a full-line department store.

In 1965, the company ventured into the supermarket and home appliance store business. It opened the first "Supermall" in the same year named SM North EDSA in Quezon City.

SM expanded abroad with the opening of its first branch in China in 2001. The mall is SM City Xiamen in Fujian.

Operations of SM Supermalls were affected by the imposition of enhanced community quarantines caused by the COVID-19 pandemic in 2020. SM lose half of its revenue in 2020 although it claimed to have maintained a healthy occupancy rate within the next two years.

Branches

There are 82 shopping malls in the Philippines operated by SM Supermalls following the opening of SM City Tuguegarao on November 18, 2022. It also has seven malls in China, with the most recent mall, SM City Tianjin opening in 2016. These include SM North EDSA in Quezon City, SM Mall of Asia in Pasay, SM Megamall in Mandaluyong and SM Seaside in Cebu City which are among the largest in the Philippines.

Tenants and amenities

SM Cinema

SM Cinema is the movie theater chain of SM Supermalls.

SM Cinema is also responsible for some milestones in the Philippine film industry.

The first drive-in theater in the Philippines was opened under the SM Cinema brand in July 2020 at SM City Pampanga.

There is a policy in place since 2002, which dictates the non-airing films rated R-18 in SM Cinemas.

SM Store

The SM Store is the department store chain of SM Supermalls. The first outlet was established in 1972 along Carriedo in Manila, when Shoemart store was converted into a full-fledged department store. It was renamed as the SM Department Store in 1975 prior to being rebranded as "SM Store". The SM Store would become one of SM Supermall's common anchor tenant.

SM Skating
SM Skating is SM's indoor ice rink chain. The first rink opened at SM Megamall in 1992 which later closed in 2006, but has since reopened in 2014 at another space. There are also ice rinks in SM Mall of Asia and SM Seaside City Cebu.

Branding
The current logo for SM Supermalls was adopted in 2022. The logo consists of the letters "SM" in a custom typeface referred to as Henry Sans after founder Henry Sy and uses a shade of blue dubbed as "SM Electric Blue".

References

External links

 SM Supermalls – Official website
 SM Supermalls China – Official website

Shopping malls in the Philippines
Philippine brands
1985 establishments in the Philippines
Shopping malls established in 1985